Sandwell Metropolitan Borough Council was created in 1974 to administer the newly formed Metropolitan Borough of Sandwell, in the West Midlands county of England.

The council offices are located at the Council House, Freeth Street, Oldbury town centre, which opened in 1989.

Sandwell is divided into 24 Wards and is represented by 72 ward councillors.   Elections to the council take place in three out of every four years, with one-third of the seats being contested at each election.

Since the Local Government Act 1985, Sandwell Council has effectively been a unitary authority, serving as the sole executive, deliberative, and legislative body responsible for local policy, setting council tax, and allocating budget in the district; although public transport, fire and police services, and the local government pension fund (West Midlands Pension Fund) are jointly run by the seven metropolitan boroughs of the West Midlands county.

Politics

Most of Sandwell's councillors are members of the Labour Party, with the Labour party having run the council since the first election in 1973, apart from one year between 1978 and 1979 when the Conservatives had a majority. By 2014, all but two of Sandwell's 72 councillors were Labour members.

In May 2021 the Conservative Party regained its presence on the Council, gaining 9 seats from the Labour Party.

In May 2013, it was announced that following a re-shuffle, there was a freeze on allowances for Sandwell Council Cabinet Members and that the membership of the cabinet was reduced from 10 to 8.

Recent history
Despite being the 14th most deprived borough in the UK, the council has invested and worked with many partners to ensure the regeneration of the borough attracting many new SME businesses.  The Leader of the Council said that "successful small businesses are essential for the economy and for thriving local communities"

Since its formation in 1974, the borough council has demolished a considerable percentage of the area's privately owned 19th and early 20th century housing stock. In the early years of this process, many of these properties lacked a bathroom or indoor toilet, as well as being generally unfit for human habitation, with refurbishment not deemed to be a viable option. The process of demolishing similar properties had in fact started before 1974 during the existence of the former West Bromwich and Warley boroughs, as well as before 1966 under the original local authorities. The borough council has also made money available for refurbishment of older private sector housing which is still deemed viable for retention.

Since the late 1980s, however, it has also demolished a considerable amount of post-1919 council housing.

The first large redevelopment of this time came in 1992/93, when the West Smethwick Estate (known locally as the "Concrete Jungle" due to its network of interlinked concrete-constructed maisonette blocks) was demolished, despite only being around 25 years old, and replaced by a new low-rise housing estate known as Galton Village.

Between 1992 and 2000, six of the nine tower blocks on the Lion Farm Estate in Oldbury (built in the early 1960s) were demolished and most of the land redeveloped with new housing.

Since 1989, parts of the Hateley Heath Estate in West Bromwich (mostly built in the late 1940s and early 1950s) have been demolished, including a section of maisonettes which were demolished in 1992 due to their unpopularity with potential tenants, as well as extensive vandalism of some of the properties while they were empty.

Between 2000 and 2005, Carisbrooke House multi-storey flats and several blocks of low-rise flats (all built in the 1960s) were demolished on the Friar Park Estate in Wednesbury, while the council has retained and updated the much older houses which make up the bulk of the estate.

Two of the four tower blocks on the 1960s Riddins Mound Estate in Cradley Heath were demolished in 1996. The remaining properties in the area, including the two surviving tower blocks, have been refurbished.

Part of the 1930s Tibbington Estate in Tipton was demolished in the 1980s due to mining subsidence, and the land redeveloped with a sheltered housing scheme which opened in 1991. Another section of the estate was demolished in 2007 and redeveloped with a new public park as well as a small development of bungalows. Elsewhere in Tipton, several maisonette blocks on the 1960s Glebefields Estate were demolished between 1989 and 1992, and the estate's two tower blocks were demolished in 2004.

A large percentage of the multi-storey flats and maisonette blocks which were built during the 1950s, 1960s and early 1970s in the areas which now make up Sandwell have been demolished.

Children's Services – In April 2013, an OFSTED report criticised Sandwell's children's services highlighting failings around domestic violence and rating the service inadequate. The following month, the council gave its backing to ambitious plans to make its children's service amongst the best in the country by teaming up with private sector firm iPOWER.

Projects include:

Smethwick Regeneration: Midland Metropolitan University Hospital, Windmill Eye NeighbourHood and a £23.5 million redevelopment of Holly Lodge College of Science (creating a state of the art learning environment for 1,250 pupils)

The Portway Lifestyle Centre, Wednesbury Leisure Centre, The Crofts and Charlemont Flats

Regeneration of West Bromwich: a significant piece of investment including provisions for new retail, entertainment, arts, education and transit links. Despite the delays, it is anticipated that the majority of the regeneration will be completed by early 2014. One of the most controversial projects has been that of The Public, a community arts venue.  In November 2013 venue was closed after the council decided that it would no longer subsidise it as an Arts Centre. The Council announced in October 2013 that it had entered into an agreement with Sandwell College to take over the building, converting it into a Sixth Form college. It is proposed that the council would need to borrow the money to refit the £70 million arts centre to make it suitable for the college whilst investors in the original project may sue the council if this proposal were to go ahead.

The leader of Sandwell Council, Darren Cooper, died suddenly on 26 March 2016, while in office. He was succeeded by deputy leader Steve Elling.

References

External links 
 

Sandwell
Metropolitan district councils of England
Local authorities in the West Midlands (county)
Local education authorities in England
Billing authorities in England
Leader and cabinet executives
1974 establishments in England